The Seven and Five Society was an art group of seven painters and five sculptors created in 1919 and based in London.

The group was originally intended to encompass traditional, conservative artistic sensibilities. The first exhibition catalogue said, "[we] feel that there has of late been too much pioneering along too many lines in altogether too much of a hurry." Artist Ben Nicholson joined in 1924, followed  Henry Moore and Barbara Hepworth, and changed the society into a modernistic one and expelled the non-modernist artists. In 1935, the group was renamed the Seven and Five Abstract Group. At the Zwemmer Gallery in Charing Cross Road, London, they staged the first exhibition of entirely abstract works in Britain.

Name
The first intention of the group was to include seven painters and five sculptors (‘VII and V’).  This became ‘Seven & Five’ and, after a suggestion by Nicholson, simply '7 & 5'.

Exhibitions

Members

References

Further reading
Glazebrook, M. (1980). "Introduction". The Seven and Five Society, 1920–35 [exhibition catalogue Parkin Gallery, London, 9 January – 10 February 1980 and regional tour, 1979–80]

The Fine Art Society (2014). The Seven and Five Society 1920–1935. London: The Fine Art Society. 

English artist groups and collectives
Organisations based in London
Arts organizations established in 1919
1919 establishments in England